The following is a complete discography of all albums released by the late American country music artist Eddy Arnold from 1955 to 2005.

Studio albums

1950s

1960s

1970s

1980s–2000s

Gospel albums

Holiday albums

Compilation albums

Singles

1940s

1950s

1960s

1970s

1980s

1990s–2000s

Other singles

Collaborations

Gospel singles

Christmas singles

Guest singles

Charted B-sides

Music videos

Notes
  
A^ "Soul Deep" also peaked at number 28 on the U.S. Billboard Hot Adult Contemporary Tracks chart and at number 23 on the RPM Adult Contemporary Tracks chart in Canada.

References

External links
 Official Website

Country music discographies
Discographies of American artists